Udara placidula is a butterfly of the family Lycaenidae. It is found in South-east Asia.

Subspecies
U. p. placidula (Borneo)
U. p. calata  (Fruhstorfer, 1910) (Flores)
U. p. confusa  Eliot and Kawazoé, 1983 (Moluccas: Buru)
U. p. howarthi  (Cantlie and Norman, 1960) (Assam to Burma, Thailand, Laos)
U. p. intensa  (Toxopeus, 1928) (Sumatra)
U. p. irenae  (Corbet, 1937) (western Malaysia)
U. p. kawazoei  H. Hayashi, 1976 (Philippines: Palawan)
U. p. lyseas  (Grose-Smith, 1895) (Moluccas: Batjan)
U. p. snelleni  (Toxopeus, 1926) (Java)

References

Butterflies described in 1895
Udara
Butterflies of Borneo
Butterflies of Asia